Bang Rin is a town (Thesaban Mueang) in Mueang Ranong District of Ranong Province in Southern Thailand, and the location of the Ranong's provincial offices. In 2015, it had a total population of 18,788 people.

References

Populated places in Ranong province